Georgy Georgyevich Kavtaradze (2 April 1940 – 20 December 2020) was a Georgian actor and filmmaker. He was born in Tbilisi, Georgia. His career began in 1957. He was known for his roles as Luka in Don't Grieve (1969), the Commissioner in Melodies of Vera Quarter (1974) and as the Educator in Wounded Game (1977).

Kavtaradze died on 20 December 2020 in Tbilisi at the age of 80.

References

External links

1940 births
2020 deaths
Film directors from Georgia (country)
Film producers from Georgia (country)
Screenwriters from Georgia (country)
Film actors from Georgia (country)
Writers from Tbilisi
20th-century screenwriters
20th-century male actors from Georgia (country)